Albert Sami Mansour is a Lebanese Greek Catholic politician. Mansour was born in 1939. He was elected to parliament from the Baalbek-Hermel constituency in the 1972 Lebanese general election. He served as the treasurer of the Lebanese National Movement.

Mansour took part in drafting the Taif Agreement, and was named Minister of Defense afterwards. He contested, unsuccessfully, the 1992, 1996, 2000 and 2005 elections but was re-elected in the 2018 elections.

References

1939 births
Living people
Members of the Parliament of Lebanon
Government ministers of Lebanon
Lebanese Melkite Greek Catholics
Syrian Social Nationalist Party in Lebanon politicians